The 2009 season was the Washington Redskins' 78th in the National Football League and their second and final under head coach Jim Zorn. During the season, long-time general manager Vinny Cerrato resigned on December 17, 2009, and the team hired  Bruce Allen before their week 15 game at home on Monday Night Football against the New York Giants.

They failed to improve upon their 8–8 record from 2008 and finished with a 4–12 record, their worst record since 2003, which resulted in Jim Zorn being fired after two seasons. He would be replaced by Mike Shanahan the following season.

Players

Transactions

The Redskins released linebacker Marcus Washington on February 20, 2009.  On February 27, the first day of 2009 free agency, the Redskins made four personnel moves.  Five hours into the new free agency period, the team signed a seven-year, $100 million contract with unrestricted free agent, Albert Haynesworth, who spent the first seven seasons of his career playing defensive tackle for the Tennessee Titans.  The deal included $41 million guaranteed and could have reached as much as $115 million, based on performance.  The Titans requested for the NFL to look into claims that Redskins management tampered with Haynesworth by beginning negotiations with him prior to the start of the free agent period.  The Redskins also released cornerback Shawn Springs; agreed to terms with former Buffalo guard (and previous Redskin) Derrick Dockery on a five-year, $26 million contract with $8.2 million in guaranteed money; and agreed with unrestricted free agent DeAngelo Hall on a new six-year, $54 million contract.  Hall's new deal contained $23 million in guaranteed money and had a maximum value of $55 million.  Hall and Dockery formally signed their contracts on March 3, 2009.

On March 2, 2009, the Redskins released defensive end Jason Taylor after he refused to add a clause to his contract that would have required him to participate in the team's off-season workout program.  In the wake of Taylor's release the Redskins re-signed defensive end Phillip Daniels, who had started at left end before a 2008 ACL tear on the first day of training camp led to Taylor's acquisition, and brought back Renaldo Wynn, who had played defensive end for the Redskins between 2002 and 2006.  Wynn and Daniels signed one-year, minimum deals on March 24 and April 2, respectively.

In late March and early April 2009, Redskins officials attempted to include starting quarterback Jason Campbell in a trade to acquire Denver Broncos quarterback Jay Cutler; they also attempted to trade Campbell to at least one other team for a second-round pick in the 2009 NFL Draft.  After Cutler was traded to the Chicago Bears on April 2, Redskins head coach Jim Zorn publicly re-asserted his commitment to Campbell.

On Dec. 17 the team announced the hiring of  Bruce Allen as Executive Vice President of Operations and General Manager, replacing Vinny Cerrato who resigned on the same day, on December 17, 2009.  Allen is the son of former Redskins head coach (1971–77) George Herbert Allen and brother of former Virginia Governor and U.S. Senator George Felix Allen.

Free agents in 2009
RFA: Restricted free-agent, UFA: Unrestricted free-agent, ERFA: Exclusive rights free agent

2009 NFL Draft selections

  Washington traded its second-round selection in 2009 (47th overall) and its sixth-round selection in 2010 to Miami for defensive end Jason Taylor on July 20, 2008.
 Washington traded its fourth-round selection in 2009 to the Jets for guard Pete Kendall on August 23, 2007.  The selection changed from a fifth-round selection in 2008 because Kendall played 80 percent of the snaps for the Redskins in 2007.
 Washington traded a seventh-round selection to Minnesota for defensive end Erasmus James on May 27, 2008.
 On draft day, Washington traded their original 5th-round selection (150th overall) to the Vikings for the Vikings' 5th-round selection (158th overall) and their seventh-round selection (221st overall) that they originally received from Washington for Erasmus James (see above).

Final roster

Schedule

Preseason

Regular season
In addition to their regular games with NFC East rivals, the Redskins played teams from the NFC South and AFC West as per the schedule rotation, and also played intraconference games against the Lions and the Rams based on their common divisional position vis-à-vis the Redskins from 2008.

Standings

Regular season results

Week 1: at New York Giants

The Redskins began their season at Giants Stadium for a Week 1 divisional duel with their NFC East rival, the New York Giants.  In the first quarter, Washington trailed early as Giants kicker Lawrence Tynes got a 28-yard field goal.  In the second quarter, the Redskins' deficit increased as quarterback Eli Manning completed a 30-yard touchdown pass to wide receiver Mario Manningham, along with defensive end Osi Umenyiora stripping quarterback Jason Campbell of the ball and returning the fumble 37 yards for a touchdown.  Washington would close out the half with punter Hunter Smith getting an 8-yard touchdown run off of a fake field goal.

The Redskins scored in the third quarter as kicker Shaun Suisham got a 27-yard field goal.  However, in the fourth quarter, New York answered with Tynes nailing a 45-yard and a 28-yard field goal.  Washington tried to rally as Campbell completed a 17-yard touchdown pass to tight end Chris Cooley, but the Giants' defense proved to be too much to overcome.

With the loss, the Redskins began their season at 0–1.

Week 2: vs. St. Louis Rams

The Redskins played their home opener against the St. Louis Rams.  Washington scored on a 21-yard field goal in the first quarter and a 28-yard field goal in the second quarter by Shaun Suisham.  The Rams would score when quarterback Marc Bulger completed a 2-yard touchdown pass to wide receiver Laurent Robinson.  In the third quarter, the Redskins regained their lead when Suisham completed a 23-yard field goal.

With the win, the Redskins improved their record to 1–1.

Week 3: at Detroit Lions

The Redskins played the Lions in Detroit.  Washington trailed early when Lions quarterback Matthew Stafford completed a 21-yard touchdown pass to wide receiver Bryant Johnson.  Detroit increased their lead when kicker Jason Hanson completed 39-yard and 26-yard field goals.

The Redskins scored in the third quarter as quarterback Jason Campbell completed a 57-yard touchdown pass to wide receiver Santana Moss.  In the fourth quarter Lions' running back Maurice Morris got a 2-yard touchdown run. Subsequently, the Lions failed a 2-point conversion attempt.  Campbell completed a 4-yard touchdown pass to running back Rock Cartwright late in the game, although the Redskins would ultimately lose.

The Lions snapped a 19-game regular season losing streak with the win.

Week 4: vs. Tampa Bay Buccaneers

The Redskins played the Tampa Bay Buccaneers in their fourth regular season game of the year.  Washington fumbled early in the game, giving the Buccaneers possession of the ball at the Redskins' 10-yard line. Tampa Bay scored on quarterback Josh Johnson's 8-yard touchdown pass to wide receiver Antonio Bryant in the first quarter. Mike Nugent's 37-yard field goal in the second quarter gave the Buccaneers a 10-point lead.

In the third quarter, the Redskins kicker Shaun Suisham made a 42-yard field goal.  Afterwards, Jason Campbell completed a 17-yard touchdown pass to tight end Chris Cooley. The point after was blocked. The Redskins also scored when Campbell threw a 59-yard pass to wide receiver Santana Moss.  Nugent successfully kicked a 22-yard field goal in the fourth quarter; setting the final score of Washington 16 to Tampa Bay 13.

Josh Johnson saw his first NFL start. Jason Campbell finished the day with three interceptions and two touchdowns.

Week 5: at Carolina Panthers

The Redskins traveled to Bank of America Stadium to face the Carolina Panthers.  Washington scored with quarterback Jason Campbell completing a 10-yard touchdown pass to running back Clinton Portis.  The Panthers gained a safety in the second quarter as linebacker Thomas Davis and defensive end Julius Peppers tackled Portis in his end zone for a safety.  Afterwards, the Redskins closed out the half with a 38-yard field goal by kicker Shaun Suisham.

Both Washington and Carolina scored touchdowns in the third quarter. The Panthers later scored on a 43-yard field goal from kicker John Kasay and an 8-yard touchdown run from running back Jonathan Stewart (along with Delhomme's 2-point conversion pass to wide receiver Steve Smith).

With the loss, the Redskins fell to 2–3.  The Panthers got their first win of the season.

Week 6: vs. Kansas City Chiefs

The Redskins returned to Washington to face another winless team, this time the 0–5 Kansas City Chiefs.

In the first quarter, both offenses did not find the end zone; the first quarter ended with no score.

In the second quarter, Chiefs kicker Ryan Succop kicked a 39-yard field goal for the only score of the half. The Redskins drove down the field with two minutes left in the half, but on the last play of the second quarter, quarterback Jason Campbell was intercepted by Chiefs cornerback Brandon Flowers at the Kansas City 3-yard line.

At the start of the second half, Washington coach Jim Zorn elected to go with backup quarterback Todd Collins over Campbell. Collins tossed a 42-yard completion on his first throw of the game. The drive ended with a 40-yard field goal by Shaun Suisham. The Redskins would take the lead with a 28-yard Suisham kick, but Kansas City tied it up with a 46-yard Succop field goal at the end of the third quarter.

In the final period, Ryan Succop put the Chiefs up 12–6 with field goals of 46 and 24 yards, but it was the Chiefs defense that closed the game out for Kansas City, as defensive end Tamba Hali sacked Todd Collins in his own end zone for a safety with under a minute to play.

Washington fell to 2–4, while the Kansas City Chiefs gained their first victory.

Week 7: vs. Philadelphia Eagles

The Redskins stayed at home for an NFC East game with the Philadelphia Eagles on Monday night.  Washington trailed early in the first quarter as Eagles wide receiver DeSean Jackson got a 67-yard touchdown run, followed by linebacker Will Witherspoon returning an interception 9 yards for a touchdown.  In the second quarter, Philadelphia increased their lead with kicker David Akers completed a 47-yard field goal.  Washington scored with quarterback Jason Campbell completing a 2-yard touchdown pass to wide receiver Devin Thomas, but the Eagles countered with a 44-yard field goal and a Jackson 57-yard touchdown pass reception.  The Redskins would then end the half with kicker Shaun Suisham making a 47-yard field goal.  Washington scored on Campbell's 1-yard touchdown pass to tight end Fred Davis in the fourth quarter.

With the loss, the Redskins went into their bye week at 2–5.

Week 8: BYE

Week 9: at Atlanta Falcons

The Redskins traveled to the Georgia Dome to play the Atlanta Falcons.  Washington trailed in the first quarter as Falcons quarterback Matt Ryan found tight end Tony Gonzalez on a 2-yard touchdown pass, followed by cornerback Tye Hill returning an interception 62 yards for a touchdown.  In the second quarter, the Redskins scored on a 48-yard field goal from Shaun Suisham.  However, Atlanta would respond with running back Michael Turner gaining a touchdown and kicker Jason Elam completing a field goal.

Washington scored in the third quarter when running back Ladell Betts completed a 1-yard touchdown run.  The Redskins also scored in the fourth quarter as quarterback Jason Campbell completed a 3-yard touchdown pass to tight end Todd Yoder. The Falcons ended the game with a 58-yard touchdown run by Turner.

Week 10: vs. Denver Broncos

Trying to snap a four-game losing streak, the Redskins went home for a Week 10 interconference duel with the Denver Broncos.  Washington would trail early in the first quarter as Broncos quarterback Kyle Orton completed a 40-yard touchdown pass to wide receiver Brandon Marshall.  The Redskins would answer with quarterback Jason Campbell's 2-yard touchdown pass to tight end Todd Yoder, but Denver came right back with Orton hooking up with Marshall again on a 75-yard touchdown pass.  In the second quarter, Washington would tie the game with a trick play, as punter Hunter Smith threw a 35-yard touchdown pass to fullback Mike Sellers.  The Broncos would close out the half with kicker Matt Prater getting a 24-yard field goal.  After a scoreless third quarter, the 'Skins would take command in the fourth quarter with running back Ladell Betts getting a 1-yard touchdown run and kicker Shaun Suisham booting a 35-yard field goal.

With the win, the Redskins improved to 3–6.

Week 11: at Dallas Cowboys

Coming off their win over the Broncos, the Redskins flew to Cowboys Stadium for their Week 11 NFC East rivalry match against the Dallas Cowboys. After a scoreless first quarter, Washington would strike in the second quarter as kicker Shaun Suisham nailed a 45-yard field goal.  The Redskins would add onto their lead in the third quarter with Suisham booting a 31-yard field goal.  However, in the fourth quarter, the Cowboys rallied as quarterback Tony Romo completing a 10-yard touchdown pass to wide receiver Patrick Crayton.

With the loss, Washington fell to 3–7.

Week 12: at Philadelphia Eagles

Coming off their Road Loss to the Cowboys. The Washington Redskins flew to Lincoln Financial Field for Week 12 to take on their NFC East Rival the Philadelphia Eagles. In the First Quarter After an Onside Kick Recovery by Washington. The Redskins strike first with QB Jason Campbell running a 2-yard Touchdown. While David Akers connected a 29-yard Field Goal, Later The Eagles took the lead with a 35-yard pass from Donovan McNabb to WR DeSean Jackson. In the 2nd Quarter The Redskins retake the Lead with Jason Campbell completing a 4-yard Touchdown pass to Santana Moss. Then Akers kicked a 24 and a 41-yard Field goal before the half. In the 3rd quarter the Redskins got the lead again completing another Touchdown pass to TE Fred Davis for 10 yards. In the 4th quarter after Shaun Suisham kick a 25-yard Field goal, The Eagles come right back with a 1-yard Touchdown by RB Eldra Buckley (with a 2-point conversion attempt by LeSean McCoy) to tie the game. Later, David Akers kick a 32-yard Field Goal.

With the Loss, Washington falls to 3–8

Week 13: vs. New Orleans Saints

Trying to rebound after their close heartbreaking road loss against The Philadelphia Eagles. The Redskins traveled home for a week 13 matchup against the Saints. In the first quarter, Washington drew first blood with Jason Campbell throwing an 8-yard touchdown pass to Fred Davis. Later, Shaun Suisham kicked a 32-yard field goal. In the second quarter, the Saints got on the board with Garrett Hartley making a 34-yard field goal, while Drew Brees on the Saints next possession struck a 40-yard touchdown pass to Marques Colston to tie the game. The Redskins then retook the lead with Campbell completing another touchdown pass to Devin Thomas for 10 yards. Along with Robert Meachem returning a 44-yard fumble for a touchdown (which Kareem Moore had an interception). In the 3rd quarter, the Redskins kicker Suisham made a 28-yard field goal. On their next possession, the Redskins extended their lead when Devin Thomas caught a 13-yard touchdown pass from Campbell. Then Garrett Hartley kicked a 27-yard field goal. In the 4th quarter, both Shaun Suisham & Garrett Hartley traded field goals, but then the Saints tied the game late when Drew Brees launched a 53-yard touchdown pass to Robert Meachem sending the game into Overtime. The Redskins won the coin toss, but Mike Sellers fumbled the ball and the Saints gained possession in Redskins territory. After a few plays, Hartley gave the Saints the overtime victory by kicking an 18-yard field goal to end the game.

With the loss, the Redskins fell to 3–9 and were officially eliminated from postseason contention.

Week 14: at Oakland Raiders

Washington entered the Oakland–Alameda County Coliseum seeking to beat the Raiders and finally earn their first road win of 2009. In the 1st quarter the Raiders scored first when K Sebastian Janikowski hit a 34-yard Field Goal. The Redskins took the lead when QB Jason Campbell found TE Fred Davis for a 6-yard Touchdown Pass. In the 2nd quarter the Raiders took the lead with RB Justin Fargas getting a 1-yard TD run. After Redskins K Graham Gano kicked a 46-yard Field Goal. the Redskins took the lead before halftime when Campbell completed his second TD pass to Davis, this time from 17 yards out. Meanwhile, in the 3rd quarter when the Raiders Only Score was Sebastian Janikowski kicking a 54-yard field goal. In the 4th quarter the Redskins extended the Lead with Quinton Ganther scoring back to back possessions on two 1-yard TD runs. While Gano nailed a 41-yard field goal to seal the win for the Redskins.

With the win, Washington not only improved to 4–9, but also won their first road game of the season.

Week 15: vs. New York Giants

Looking to muster their first winning streak of the season, the Washington Redskins took on the rival New York Giants on Monday Night Football. To add to the fanfare, Redskins owner Daniel Snyder hired Bruce Allen to be the new General Manager. However, the Redskins came out flat, and trailed 24–0 by halftime. With a chance to kick a field goal as the half ended to cut it to a 24–3 deficit, the Redskins tried one of the most ill-advised and ill-fated fake field goal attempts of all-time. Redskins P Hunter Smith sent the entire offensive line in motion, along with K Graham Gano. The first attempt was foiled by a Giants time-out. The second attempt was intercepted and almost taken back for a 31–0 lead. In the 2nd half, the Redskins finally got on the board, scoring on a touchdown pass to Fred Davis. However, it was too little, too late, as K Graham Gano missed the extra point. The Redskins would not score again until it was 38–6 Giants. RB Quinton Ganther scored on a 2-yard scamper, but the Redskins came up a foot short on the 2-point conversion, which sealed any slim chance there was of a comeback. When all was said and done, the Giants won 45–12.

With the crushing loss, Washington fell to 4–10, losing ten games or more for the third time in six seasons.

Week 16: vs. Dallas Cowboys

Trying to win an NFC East game this season. The Washington Redskins stayed home for a Week 16 Showdown against the Dallas Cowboys. In the First Quarter the Cowboys Strike first with Tony Romo throwing a 4-yard Touchdown Pass to Roy Williams. In the Second Quarter Dallas Struck again with Marion Barber running a 3-yard Touchdown. While in the 4th quarter  Shaun Suisham made a 23-yard Field Goal.

With the loss, Washington not only fell to 4–11, but failed to win a single game within their division (0–6), failed to win consecutive games in a season for the first time since 2004, and had their first shutout loss since October 30, 2005 to the Giants 0–36, and their first home shutout loss since December 14, 2003, also to the Cowboys.

Week 17: at San Diego Chargers

Coming off their shutout loss against the Cowboys, the Washington Redskins traveled to Qualcomm Stadium for a week-17 match-up against The San Diego Chargers. In the first quarter, The Chargers scored first with Nate Kaeding kicking a 47-yard field goal. Following the Chargers Next possession extended their Lead with Antonio Gates catching a 12-yard pass from Philip Rivers for a 10–0 lead. In the 2nd quarter the Chargers Continue to Roll with Nate Keading kicking a 24-yard Field Goal but The Redskins get on the Board with Jason Campbell throwing a 2-yard touchdown pass to Todd Yoder. Meanwhile, Before halftime after a long pass from Jason Campbell to WR Malcolm Kelly which would've been his first TD as a Redskin this season. the Redskins take the Lead with Jason Campbell completing a 3-yard touchdown to Mike Sellers. In the 3rd and fourth quarter Both Graham Gano and Nate Keading traded Field Goals apiece. While the Chargers set up a 2-yard game-winning touchdown from Billy Volek to Mike Tolbert.

With the loss, Washington ended the season at 4–12.

Statistics

Passing

Rushing

Receiving

Kicking

Punting

Defense

References

External links

 2009 Season on the Official Website
 2009 Washington Redskins season at Pro Football Reference
 2009 Washington Redskins season at ESPN

Washington
Washington Redskins seasons
Red